Igam Ogam is a pre-school stop motion animated television series created by Andrew Offiler.

Format 
The series takes place on a “higgledy-piggledy” prehistoric planet and follows the antics of a little mischievous cave girl called Igam Ogam and her friends.

Characters 
 Igam Ogam -  The main heroine, a prehistoric unruly girl. Voiced by Sian Bradbury in season 1 and Ruby Llewelyn in season 2.
 Triple Tog – A flat sabre-toothed tiger, who acts as Igam Ogam’s blanket. He is the grumpy voice of reason, reminiscent of Eeyore in the Winnie-the-Pooh books. Voiced by Bernard Latham
 Doggie – Igam Ogam’s pet dog-like dinosaur (raptor) of the Lickasaurus kind, who likes to play hide and seek. Voiced by Bernard Latham
 Big Daddy – A T-Rex, who acts as the only authority and father figure to Igam Ogam. Voiced by Tony Leader
 Roly – Igam Ogam’s best friend, a monkey/ape (dryopithecine/chimpanzee) obsessed with bananas, who gets around by rolling forwards. Voiced by Ali Curries in season 1 and Hallie Green in season 2.
  Birdie – Igam Ogam’s second friend, a wise pterodactyl lady. Voiced by Ruth Jones
 Narrator - A voice which comments on Igam Ogam's antics, but also addresses the characters and talks with them. Voiced by Ruth Jones
 Wriggle Wiggle – A fluffy worm with a mischievous sense of humour.
 Finian – A fish, who wants to be friends with Igam Ogam and can move outside of water. Introduced in season 2. Voiced by Sean Clancy

Episodes

Season 1 (2006-2009)

Season 2 (2009-2013)

Production 
The series is produced by Welsh company Calon and German company ZDF Enterprises for Five and S4C. For the first season, BBC Alba, Soundworks and Wales Creative IP Fund joined as co-producers. For the second season, Irish company Telegael Teoranta joined as a co-production company. The main creative team and voice talent have stayed the same throughout the seasons. However, the two parts voiced by children such as Igam Ogam and Roly were recast.

Release

Broadcast 
The first season aired on Channel 5 in their kids block Milkshake! from March till May 2010 and the second season got its first run from 31 October 2006 until December 2013 on the same channel.

The series was also broadcast on Knowledge Kids and BBC Kids (Canada), KiKa (Germany), ČT :D (Czech Republic), ABC Kids (Australia) and NPO Zappelin (Netherlands).

Home media and online viewing 
8 episodes from the first season were made available on a DVD self-released by Calon, available in separate Welsh and English editions.
On 14 April 2014 the first 13 episodes of the first season were given an official retail DVD release in United Kingdom through Signature Entertainment.

Season 1 is available on Amazon Instant Video in United Kingdom.

Adaptations 
Calon released two picture books, Where's My Doggie? and I'm Not Igam Ogam, covering the specific episodes.

The Welsh creative dance company Coreo Cymru and the Wales Millennium Centre in association with Calon have produced a live dance and acrobatics stage show called The Igam Ogam Show (Sioe Igam Ogam in Welsh language), which toured several Welsh cities in summer 2013. The show was created by Carole Blade.

References

External links 
 IMDB entry
 Igam Ogam at the Milkshake! website
 Series info at the ZDF Enterprises website
 Air date schedule and synopses on the Channel 5 website
 Season 2 info at the Telegael website

2010 British television series debuts
2010s Welsh television series
2010s British children's television series
British children's animated comedy television series
British preschool education television series
British stop-motion animated television series
Welsh television shows
Animated preschool education television series
2010s preschool education television series
Animated television series about children